The infinite canvas refers to the potentially limitless space that is available to webcomics presented on the World Wide Web. The term was introduced by Scott McCloud in his 2000 book Reinventing Comics, in which he suggested that webcomic creators could make a web page as large as needed to contain a comic page of any conceivable size. This infinite canvas would create an endless amount of storytelling benefits and would allow creators much more freedom in how they present their artwork.

Journalists responded skeptically to McCloud's idea of the infinite canvas, as five years after Reinventing Comics, the concept had not taken off in large proportions yet. Webcomics were primarily presented in the form of comic strips, which fit easily on a screen. Various webcomic creators have experimented with the infinite canvas, however, and extending comics to beyond what is possible in print has gained some popularity over the years.

Description

In comic books, the panels of each page are laid out in such as a way to fit perfectly on the page, forcing cartoonists into a relatively small set of possible panel lay-outs per page. In his 2000 book, Reinventing Comics, cartoonist Scott McCloud proposed a solution for this situation in the form of the web page. Instead of using the monitor on which a webcomic is read as a "page", McCloud suggested using it as a "window" upon an infinite canvas. A webcomic could be made to be infinitely large, and the cartoonist could give a reader the ability to zoom in and out on it at will. McCloud claimed webcomics could be laid out in any shape: vertically like a tower, horizontally like a skyline, diagonally like a descending staircase, or even three dimensionally like a revolving cube.

According to David Balan of Sequart Organization, webcomics with pages of limited size that use hyperlinks to move forward in the story consistently take the reader out of the experience, as there exists no visual link between any two pages. This issue is solved with a long, scrollable canvas, where the webcomic is presented as one long image. Such a webcomic may drag on, however, due to a lack of rhythm or punctuated story beats. Balan praised McCloud's 2003 webcomic, The Right Number, for its zooming interface, which would have the same benefits as other infinite canvas formats, but still allows for a certain rhythm to exist. Other artists known for making persistent use of the infinite canvas in the early 2000s include Cayetano Garza, demian5, Patrick Farley, Tristan A. Farnon, and David Gaddis.

Observations and responses
In 2005, Sarah Boxer of The New York Times stated that the infinite canvas was hard to find in use, as many webcomics were sticking to a printable format. A few, however, like Nicholas Gurewitch's The Perry Bible Fellowship and Drew Weing's Pup, did make use of the format (Pup won a Web Cartoonists' Choice Award in the "infinite canvas" category in 2005). Boxer pointed out that most popular webcomics either fit on a webpage easily – such as Adrian Ramos's Count Your Sheep – or attempted to use various aspects of the digital medium, such as Flash animation and music. That same year, Joe Zabel also noted that the primary purpose for the infinite canvas would be to create lengthy and deep works on the Web, while comic strips like PvP and Penny Arcade showed to have much more success in this environment. Because of the time that would go into any page of an infinite canvas comic, Zabel deemed it unlikely for such webcomics to gain a large popularity. Journalist Eric Burns, meanwhile, claimed that McCloud was mainly discussing the potential of webcomics, rather than what they are actually like.

In an interview in 2008, Scott McCloud said that in Reinventing Comics he was "shooting for the moon, in hopes that we could create these radical departures from traditional comics," noting that "most online comics are still pretty conservative in format and style" but also that "there have been some impressive strides in that direction." McCloud specified that he was still keeping an eye on things that needed to happen for the infinite canvas to take off, saying that "the notion of Web applications being as robust as desktop applications has placed us closer to that hope that we may finally be able to create those spaces in a seamless way online. Right now, it's very difficult to do that." In an interview in 2014, McCloud said that "without a reliable financial structure to support these experimental webcomics, a lot of people just turn away and get a real job, or start doing three-panel gag strips. Those have an economic model that works."

Regardless of the format's initial popularity, a large amount of cartoonists have created infinite canvas webcomics over the years; in the book Storytelling in the Media Convergence Age, cartoonist Daniel Goodbrew states that "the infinite canvas has remained a popular choice among webcomic creators." The infinite canvas has shown more success in Europe and Australia than in North America. The infinite canvas has obtained a large popularity among South Korean webtoons: McCloud noted in 2014 that "most digital comics are scrollers in Korea."

Usage and augmentation

In 2005, Daniel Merlin Goodbrey created the "Tarquin Engine", a piece of Web software that uses Adobe Flash to depict an infinite canvas that a reader can freely scroll through and zoom in on. It greatly simplified the production of infinite canvas webcomics. The tool is not widely used. In 2009, Microsoft Live Labs released an infinite canvas web application, which reached a wider audience.

In 2013, Yvyes Bigerel and Mark Waid of Marvel Comics launched an initiative to create and publish digital comics under the title Marvel ReEvolution. While creating these webcomics, Bigerel and Waid were inspired by the manner in which time is experienced within comics, as the passage of time in a comic book is ultimately controlled by its reader. Rather than to allow readers to skim through the images on a whim or to increase the space between panels as McCloud suggested, the duo stacked the panels up "like a PowerPoint slideshow," forcing the reader to look at one panel at a time. According to Comic Book Resources, this design directly affects how a comic is created and read, as surprises can be better controlled and a letterer could directly control the reading order of text balloons. Rachel Edidin of Wired said of Wolverine: Japan's Most Wanted and Iron Man: Fatal Frontier that "these are comics that truly feel native to the digital format."

In 2016, Oculus Story Studio released Quill, a piece of software that allows people to create a three-dimensional world on an "infinite canvas", meant to be experienced through virtual reality. In September 2021, Facebook, now the owner of Oculus, sold Quill to its original creator, who continues to develop and support the app.

References

 

 
Webcomic formats
Digital art
Comics terminology